An inertia wheel pendulum is a pendulum with an inertia wheel attached. It can be used as a pedagogical problem in control theory. This type of pendulum is often confused with the gyroscopic effect, which has completely different physical nature.

See also 
 Inverted pendulum
 Robotic unicycle
 Spinning top

References 
  Mark W. Spong, Peter Corke, Rogelio Lozano. Nonlinear Control of the Gyroscopic Pendulum.

Pendulums
Control engineering